Charles Kazlauskas (born November 12, 1982) is an American former professional soccer player who is currently the head coach of Derde Klasse club SV Blauw Wit and assistant coach to the Vitesse U17 side.

Career 
Born in Milwaukee, Kazlauskas signed for Dutch club NEC in 2001, making his senior debut for them on August 14, 2001 in the KNVB Cup. He spent the 2003–04 season on loan at Fortuna Sittard, and signed permanently for TOP Oss in 2005. He made his 100th appearance for Oss in February 2008. Kazlauskas was offered a new contract by Oss in April 2009, but he left the club later that summer, signing for Helmond Sport. He retired in 2017 as part of JVC Cuijk.

References

External

1982 births
Living people
American soccer players
American expatriate soccer players
American people of Lithuanian descent
NEC Nijmegen players
Fortuna Sittard players
TOP Oss players
Helmond Sport players
Soccer players from Milwaukee
Eredivisie players
Eerste Divisie players
United States men's under-20 international soccer players
De Treffers players
JVC Cuijk players
Association football defenders
SBV Vitesse non-playing staff
American expatriate soccer coaches
Expatriate footballers in the Netherlands
American expatriate sportspeople in the Netherlands